Abdul Aleem Khan (born 5 March 1972) is a Pakistani former politician and a business tycoon. Abdul Aleem Khan owns Samaa TV and Vision Group. He was also the Senior Minister of Punjab and Minister of Food from 2020 to 2021. He also served as a member of the Provincial Assembly of the Punjab from August 2018 to 2021. He announced his separation from politics on Twitter in a tweet. Later in a statement to the media, he said that he has no intentions of joining politics. He also said that his current focus is on the welfare work he has been doing through the Abdul Aleem Khan Foundation to bring prosperity and comfort to the most neglected segment of society.

Previously, he served as a Provincial Minister of Punjab for Local Government & Community Development and Provincial Minister of Punjab for Planning & Development from 27 August 2018 to 6 February 2019. He was a member of the Provincial Assembly of the Punjab from 2003 to 2007 and also served as Provincial Minister for Information Technology of Punjab for the same period.

Early life and education
Khan was born on 5 October 1972 in Lahore, Pakistan. He hails from Pashtun family of the Kakazai tribe.

He received his early education from Crescent Model Higher Secondary School, Lahore.

He graduated from the Government College University, Lahore in 1992 and has a degree of Bachelor of Arts.

Philanthropy
Abdul Aleem Khan as an entrepreneur has always believed in giving back to the community. Apart from business, Abdul Aleem Khan has made a foundation named "Abdul Aleem Khan Foundation" which is currently working in various sectors of Education, Health, and Community Development. The Foundation is currently running free Water Filtration Plants, free dispensaries, and an orphanage for girls by the name of “Apna Ghar,” an institute for special children called The Rising Sun Institute, and Begum Naseem Khan Memorial Girls High School providing free education for underprivileged girls. Abdul Aleem Khan Foundation continuously makes financial contributions to the Health and Education sector by making donations to various institutions.

The Foundation has made contributions to various jails across Punjab, Pakistan, for the rehabilitation and welfare of prisoners. The foundation has also taken up the responsibility to help pay the fines of prisoners who have completed their sentences but cannot afford to pay, secure their release, and give them another chance at a better life.

As Pakistan was devastated by the flash floods in 2022, the Abdul Aleem Khan foundation like always was present to lend a helping hand to those affected by these deadly floods. All those affected by the floods in the provinces of Punjab, Sindh, and Balochistan were provided relief in the form of Rations, Blankets, and Tents.

Business career
Abdul Aleem Khan is the owner of Vision Group which is a leading real estate development company in Pakistan.

Vision Group took its first step into existence when the ParkView City brand was introduced in Lahore's real estate market. Since then, there has been no looking back. ParkView City is now a major player in real estate development on a national level.

ParkView City by Vision Group has not only taken its real estate projects to cities nationwide but has also diversified its businesses to international level.

Vision Group has entered the education sector with The National School which aims to equip the youth to excel in real life.

Political career
Abdul Aleem Khan made his political debut in 2002 and ran for the seat of the National Assembly of Pakistan as a candidate of Pakistan Muslim League (Q) (PML-Q) from Constituency NA-127 (Lahore-X) in 2002 Pakistani general election but was unsuccessful. He received 20,545 votes and lost the seat to Muhammad Tahir-ul-Qadri.

He was elected to the Provincial Assembly of the Punjab as a candidate of PML-Q from Constituency PP-147 (Lahore-XI) in by-election held in January 2003 He received 18,059 votes and defeated Ameer ul Azim, a candidate of Muttahida Majlis-e-Amal (MMA). On 15 November 2003, he was inducted into the provincial Punjab cabinet of Chief Minister Chaudhry Pervaiz Elahi and was appointed as Provincial Minister of Punjab for Information Technology. He remained as the Provincial Minister for Information Technology of Punjab till 2007.

He ran for the seat of the National Assembly as a candidate of PML-Q from Constituency NA-127 (Lahore-X) in 2008 Pakistani general election but was unsuccessful. He received 13,707 votes and lost the seat to Naseer Ahmed Bhutta. In the same election, he also ran for the seat of the Provincial Assembly of the Punjab as a candidate of PML-Q from Constituency PP-147 (Lahore-XI) but was unsuccessful. He received 9,493 votes and lost the seat to Mohsin Latif.

In January 2012, he quit PML-Q and joined Pakistan Tehreek-e-Insaf (PTI). In February 2013, he was elected as Deputy President of PTI Lahore.

He was not given ticket by PTI to contest in 2013 Pakistani general election.

He ran for the seat of the National Assembly as a candidate of PTI from Constituency NA-122 (Lahore-V) in by-election held in October 2015 but was unsuccessful. He received 72,043 votes and lost the seat to Sardar Ayaz Sadiq. He filed a petition with the Election Commission of Pakistan (ECP) to challenge the results of the by-election. He alleged rigging was done in the constituency and claimed of having evidence. In 2016, the ECP said that Khan had submitted fake affidavits to prove the rigging allegation.

In July 2016, PTI appointed him as the president of the party's central Punjab chapter.

He was elected to the Provincial Assembly of the Punjab as a candidate of PTI from Constituency PP-158 (Lahore-XV) in 2018 Pakistani general election.

On 27 August 2018, he was inducted into the provincial Punjab cabinet of Chief Minister Sardar Usman Buzdar and was appointed as Provincial Minister of Punjab for Local Government and Community Development. He was given the status of a senior minister in the cabinet.

In October 2018, Prime Minister Imran Khan ordered Khan to vacate the Punjab Chief Minister's camp office in Lahore after he was found of not fully cooperating with Chief Minister Usman Buzdar.

In February 2019, he was arrested by the National Accountability Bureau (NAB). The same day, he announced his resignation as Provincial Minister of Punjab for Local Government and Community Development.

The resignation was presented by Mr. Abdul Aleem Khan as he believed it would not be morally right for him to stay in office. Lahore High Court granted bail to Mr. Khan and  On 13 April 2020, He has been inducted again in the Provincial Cabinet and been appointed as the Senior Minister of Punjab and  Provincial Minister of Punjab for Food.

He was also the Chairman of the Corona Task Force in Punjab.

In November 2021, He resigned as minister of food.    

On 20 May 2022, he was de-seated on 16 April 2022 after standing and voting against Imran Khan and his front man Usman Buzdar.

Assets
He made two financial transactions of Rs 198 million and Rs 140 million during his tenure as Provincial Minister of Punjab for Information Technology between 2002 and 2007.

According to documents submitted to the Election Commission of Pakistan in 2018, Khan declared his assets worth .

References

1972 births
Living people
People named in the Panama Papers
Pakistan Muslim League (Q) MPAs (Punjab)
Punjab MPAs 2002–2007
Pakistan Tehreek-e-Insaf MPAs (Punjab)
Provincial ministers of Punjab
Punjab MPAs 2018–2023
Pakistanis named in the Pandora Papers